The Roman Catholic Diocese of Nakuru is a diocese located in the city of Nakuru in the Ecclesiastical province of Nairobi in Kenya.

History
 January 11, 1968: Established as Diocese of Nakuru from the Diocese of Eldoret, Diocese of Kisumu and Metropolitan Archdiocese of Nairobi

Bishops
 Bishops of Catholic Diocese Nakuru (Roman rite)
 Fr. Denis Newman, S.P.S. (Apostolic Administrator 1968 – 30 Aug 1971)
Raphael S. Ndingi Mwana a'Nzeki (30 Aug 1971 Appointed - 14 Jun 1996 Appointed, Coadjutor Archbishop of Nairobi) 
Peter J. Kairo (21 Apr 1997 Appointed - 19 Apr 2008 Appointed, Archbishop of Nyeri) 
Maurice Muhatia Makumba (19 Dec 2009 Appointed -18 Feb 2022)

Other priests of this diocese who became bishops
Dominic Kimengich, appointed auxiliary bishop of Lodwar in 2010
Alfred Kipkoech Arap Rotich, appointed auxiliary bishop of Nairobi in 1996

Sources
 GCatholic.org
 Catholic Hierarchy

Roman Catholic dioceses in Kenya
Christian organizations established in 1968
Nakuru
Roman Catholic dioceses and prelatures established in the 20th century
Roman Catholic Ecclesiastical Province of Nairobi